Playlist: The Very Best of Ruben Studdard  is a compilation of recordings by singer Ruben Studdard. It is part of a series of similar Playlist albums issued on the Legacy label by Sony Music Entertainment.

The album, released on January 26, 2010, includes selections from Studdard's first four studio albums. A PDF file included on the CD contains the song credits, photographs, and liner notes.

Track listing
"I Can't Help It" (Susaye Greene, Stevie Wonder) - 4:05
"Together" (Mikkel S. Eriksen, Tor Erik Hermansen, Phillip Taj Jackson, Martin Kleveland) - 4:25
"Just Because"  (Larry Addison) - 4:11
"The Return (Of the Velvet Teddy Bear)" (Kevin Cates, Kenneth Gamble, Leon Huff, Harold Lilly) - 4:14
"Make Ya Feel Beautiful" (Shaffer Smith,  SheaTaylor) - 3:29
"Change Me" (Luke Boyd, Antonio Dixon, Harvey Mason, Jr., Steve Russell, Tank, Damon Thomas) -3:51
"I Need an Angel" (R. Kelly) - 4:53
"Goin’ Up Yonder" (Walter Hawkins) - 3:42
"Restoration" (Marvin Winans) - 4:01
"Sorry 2004" (Eric Dawkins, Tony Dixon, Ronnie Jackson, Harvey Mason, Jr., Damon Thomas) - 4:23
"For All We Know" (J. Fred Coots, Lewis, Sam) - 3:42
"Flying Without Wings" (Wayne Hector, Steve Mac) - 3:45
"Center of my Joy" (Gloria Gaither, Bill Gaither, Richard Smallwood) - 5:54
"Superstar" (Bonnie Bramlett, Leon Russell) - 5:03

Reception

This album failed to chart and sold a total of 1,000 copies.

References

External links
Legacy Recordings - Ruben Studdard

Ruben Studdard albums
Studdard, Ruben
2010 compilation albums
19 Recordings compilation albums